Hecht may refer to:

Hecht (surname)
 Hecht, a pop rock band from Lucerne, Switzerland.
 Hecht's, a chain of department stores, also known as Hecht Brothers, Hecht Bros. and the Hecht Company
 Hecht Museum at Haifa University in Israel
 Hecht (submarine), a German World War II two-person submarine
 Wolf pack Hecht ("Pike"), a group of German World War II U-boats 
 Hecht is a gymnastics dismount skill performed on the horizontal bar or uneven bars
 Hecht vault, a type of vault in gymnastics

See also
 Justice Hecht (disambiguation)